Inagaw na Bituin (Lit: Taken Star / English: Written in the Stars) is a 2019 Philippine musical drama television series starring Kyline Alcantara and Therese Malvar. The series premiered on GMA Network's GMA Afternoon Prime block and worldwide on GMA Pinoy TV from February 11, 2019 to May 17, 2019, replacing Ika-5 Utos.

NUTAM (Nationwide Urban Television Audience Measurement) People in Television Homes ratings are provided by AGB Nielsen Philippines. 
The series ended, but its the 13th-week run, and with 68 episodes. It was replaced by Dahil sa Pag-ibig.

Series overview

Episodes

February 2019

March 2019

April 2019

May 2019

References

Lists of Philippine drama television series episodes